Dariusz Skrzypczak (born 13 November 1967) is a Polish football manager and former player. He most recently worked as an assistant coach for Ekstraklasa club Raków Częstochowa.

Honours

Club
Lech Poznań
Ekstraklasa: 1989–90, 1991–92, 1992–93
Polish Cup: 1987–88
Polish Super Cup: 1990, 1992

References

External links
Dariusz Skrzypczak at Footballdatabase

1967 births
Living people
Polish footballers
Lech Poznań players
FC Aarau players
Poland international footballers
Association football midfielders
Polish football managers
Stal Mielec managers
Polish expatriate footballers
Expatriate footballers in Switzerland
Polish expatriate sportspeople in Switzerland
FC Solothurn managers
People from Rawicz